Xavier "Xavi" Quintillà Guasch (born 23 August 1996) is a Spanish professional footballer who plays for Portuguese club C.D. Santa Clara. Mainly a left back, he can also play as a central defender.

Club career

Barcelona
Born in Lleida, Catalonia, Quintillà joined FC Barcelona's youth setup in 2009, from hometown UE Lleida. After finishing his graduation, he was promoted to the reserves in July 2015, after the club's relegation to Segunda División B.

Quintillà made his senior debut on 22 August 2015, starting in a 1–2 loss at UE Cornellà. On 26 August of the following year, after contributing with only eight league appearances, he was loaned to fellow third division side Lleida Esportiu for the campaign.

On 1 September 2017, Quintillà terminated his contract with Barça.

Villarreal
On 1 September 2017, just hours after leaving Barcelona, Quintillà joined Villarreal CF and was initially assigned to the B-team. On 1 November of the following year, he made his first-team debut by starting in a 3–3 away draw against UD Almería, for the season's Copa del Rey. On 30 March 2019 he made his La Liga debut, playing all but the final two minutes of a 3–2 loss at RC Celta de Vigo.

Promoted to the main squad for the 2019–20 season, Quintillà featured sparingly but still renewed his contract until 2023 on 25 February 2020.

On 18 August 2020, Quintillà joined EFL Championship side Norwich City on loan. He scored his first goal in a 3–1 win against Queens Park Rangers the following 24 April, and ended his spell at Carrow Road as a title winner.

Quintillà joined Segunda División side Leganés on a season-long loan deal on 10 July 2021, with an option to buy. He played just over a third of the games in a mid-table finish, scoring once to equalise in a 1–1 home draw with SD Ponferradina on 12 December.

Santa Clara
On 4 July 2022, free agent Quintillà signed for two years at C.D. Santa Clara of the Portuguese Primeira Liga.

Personal life
Quintillà's older brother, Jordi, is also a footballer, who plays as a midfielder. Both were at Barcelona together.

Career statistics

Honours
Barcelona
UEFA Youth League: 2013–14

Norwich City
EFL Championship: 2020–21

References

External links

1996 births
Living people
Sportspeople from Lleida
Spanish footballers
Footballers from Catalonia
Association football defenders
La Liga players
Segunda División B players
Tercera División players
FC Barcelona Atlètic players
Lleida Esportiu footballers
Villarreal CF B players
Villarreal CF players
English Football League players
Norwich City F.C. players
Primeira Liga players
C.D. Santa Clara players
Spain youth international footballers
Spanish expatriate footballers
Expatriate footballers in England
Expatriate footballers in Portugal
Spanish expatriate sportspeople in England
Spanish expatriate sportspeople in Portugal